is a Japanese voice actress from Kashiwazaki, Niigata. Her best-known role is as the title character Shinnosuke Nohara in the long-running anime series Crayon Shin-chan.  She also voices Mipple in the original Futari wa Pretty Cure, Sally Yoshinaga in The Brave Express Might Gaine, Paffy Pafuricia in Haō Taikei Ryū Knight,  Relena Peacecraft in Mobile Suit Gundam Wing, Ayumi Himekawa in Glass Mask, Riku and Diva in Blood+, Longlong in Shizuku-chan and Kohaku in Inuyasha. In video games, she voices Annie Barrs in Tales of series, and has dubbed for Anakin Skywalker and Harry Potter in some of the live-action films and video games. She is also known for being the voice of Spyro the Dragon in the Spyro video games, which she retired from in 2000. On June 29, 2018, Akiko Yajima retired from her career as Shinnosuke Nohara's voice actress and newly announced that Yumiko Kobayashi took over the role as Shinnosuke Nohara.

Filmography

Anime

Film

Video games

Drama CDs

Other dubbing

References

External links
  
 

1967 births
Living people
Voice actresses from Niigata Prefecture
Japanese video game actresses
Japanese voice actresses
20th-century Japanese actresses 
21st-century Japanese actresses